Richard Dürr (1 December 1938 – 30 May 2014) was a Swiss international footballer who played as a midfielder.

Durr played for Lausanne Sports during his club career, and scored a consolation goal for them in their 1st round 2nd leg game against Raba ETO Győr in the 1969–70 Inter-Cities Fairs Cup.

He earned 29 senior caps for the Switzerland national football team, and participated in the 1962 FIFA World Cup and the 1966 FIFA World Cup. The only goal he scored for them was against Cyprus on 8 November 1967.

He has run a football bar in Lausanne for almost 50 years. It is decorated with football memorabilia, and is especially popular with fans when Switzerland are playing in major tournaments.

References

1938 births
2014 deaths
Swiss men's footballers
Switzerland international footballers
1962 FIFA World Cup players
1966 FIFA World Cup players
FC Lausanne-Sport players
Association football midfielders